Miss Macau (澳門小姐) is a national beauty pageant in Macau. It was first held in 1972. The current Miss Macau is Bobo Leong (梁洛郗), winner of the 2019 pageant.

Summary of winners

Representatives at Big Four pageants 
Macau has been represented in the Big Four international beauty pageants, the four major international beauty pageants for women. These are Miss World, Miss Universe, Miss International and Miss Earth.

Miss World Macau 
Color key

Miss International Macau 
Color key

Miss Earth Macau 
Color key

Minor International Pageants

Miss Chinese International 

Color key

Miss Asia Pacific International 
Color key

References

External links 

Recurring events established in 1986
Beauty pageants in Macau
1986 establishments in Macau